VVL can stand for:

 Prison Officers' Union, in Finland
 The Union of Insurance Employees, in Finland, usually written "VvL"
 Variable valve lift, a type of automotive piston engine
 The lectin of Hairy vetch (Vicia villosa)